Hassan Ndam (born 29 October 1998) is a Cameroonian professional footballer who plays as a defender for New York Red Bulls in Major League Soccer.

Club career

Rainbow Bamenda
Born in Foumban, Ndam began his professional career with Rainbow Bamenda.

New York Red Bulls
Ndam signed with Major League Soccer side New York Red Bulls from Rainbow Bamenda on 31 January 2017. He made his debut with New York Red Bulls II on 25 March 2017, in a 3–3 draw against Pittsburgh Riverhounds. On 19 August 2017, Ndam scored his first goal as a professional, heading in a free kick in 4–0 victory over FC Cincinnati.
 In his first year as a professional Ndam made 27 appearances with Red Bulls II scoring 1 goal, being regarded as one of the top young prospects in the league.

On 22 July 2017 Ndam made his debut with the Red Bulls first team, appearing as a late game substitute in a 3–0 victory over Minnesota United. Ndam made his first start for the first team on 6 June 2018, in the team's 4–0 derby win over New York City FC in the fourth round of the 2018 Lamar Hunt U.S. Open Cup. A few days later, on 9 June, Ndam made his first league start for New York in a 1–1 draw at Columbus Crew. On 6 July 2018, Ndam scored his first goal of the season for New York Red Bulls II in a 6–1 victory over Atlanta United 2.

FC Cincinnati
On 11 December 2018, Ndam was selected by FC Cincinnati in the 2018 MLS Expansion Draft.  On May 1, 2019, Ndam was loaned to the Charlotte Independence for the remainder of the USL Championship season.

On 1 February 2020, Ndam was loaned to Miami FC for the 2020 USL Championship season. While with Miami, Ndam was a regular starter making 14 league appearances.

He was released by Cincinnati at the end of their 2020 season.

Orange County SC
On 10 June 2022, Ndam signed a 25-day short-term contract with USL Championship side Orange County SC.

Return to New York Red Bulls
On 14 July 2022, New York Red Bulls II announced that they had signed Ndam. On 3 September 2022, Ndam was signed to the club's MLS roster.

International career
Ndam has represented Cameroon at the Under-17 and Under-20 levels.

Career statistics

Honors

Club
New York Red Bulls
MLS Supporters' Shield (1): 2018

References

External links
Hassan Ndam at New York Red Bulls

1998 births
Living people
Cameroonian footballers
Cameroonian expatriate footballers
Rainbow FC (Cameroon) players
New York Red Bulls players
New York Red Bulls II players
FC Cincinnati players
Charlotte Independence players
Miami FC players
Orange County SC players
Association football defenders
Expatriate soccer players in the United States
Major League Soccer players
USL Championship players
Cameroonian expatriate sportspeople in the United States
Cameroon youth international footballers
Cameroon under-20 international footballers